Dean A. "Skippy" Joanisse (born December 8, 1971) is a Canadian curler from Maple Ridge, British Columbia.

Career
Joanisse is most notable for skipping his British Columbia team to the 1989 Canadian Junior Curling Championships title, qualifying him to represent Canada at the 1990 World Junior Curling Championships. At the World Juniors, he lost to Peja Lindholm's team from Sweden in the bronze medal final.

Joanisse also skipped two teams to the Brier. At the 2001 Nokia Brier his team finished with a 4-7 record. He qualified for the 2007 Brier by defeating Greg McAulay 8–6 in the BC final. 

Joanisse's profession is a curling artist.

References

External links
 

1971 births
Curlers from Victoria, British Columbia
Sportspeople from Abbotsford, British Columbia
Living people
Canadian male curlers
People from Maple Ridge, British Columbia